E 006 is a European B class road in Tajikistan and Uzbekistan, connecting the cities Ayni – Kokand. Since European routes are not signposted in Tajikistan and Uzbekistan, the E006 has never seen in a direction sign in any form.

Route 

 РБ01 Road: Ayni (E 123) - Dehmoy - Khujand
 РБ14 Road: Dehmoy - Ghafurov - Konibodom - Border of Uzbekistan

 Border of Tajikistan - Kokand (E 007)

References

External links 
 UN Economic Commission for Europe: Overall Map of E-road Network (2007)

International E-road network
Roads in Tajikistan
Roads in Uzbekistan